The Asian Equestrian Federation (AEF) is the governing body of equestrian in Asia. It is one of the five continental confederations making up the International Federation for Equestrian Sports (FEI). AEF was formed in 1978 in Bangkok (Thailand). AEF has headquarters in Doha, Qatar and consists of 35 member federations.

Tournaments
 Asian Games

Members
Regional Group 1

Regional Group 2

Regional Group 3

 India

 Islamic Republic of Pakistan
 Philippines

Regional Group 4

Regional Group 5

References

External links
  

Asia
E
Sports organizations established in 1978
1978 establishments in Thailand
International organizations based in Thailand